KBFR was a class A radio station in Desert Center, California, licensed to Sunnylands Broadcasting, LLC.

History
KBFR began broadcasting as KNBQ on July 25, 2013. On February 12, 2015, the call sign changed to KBFR.

KBFR went silent on January 22, 2016, for technical reasons. On December 12, 2016, Sunnylands Broadcasting surrendered the station's license to the Federal Communications Commission (FCC). The FCC cancelled KBFR's license on December 19, 2016.

References

External links

2014 establishments in California
Desert Center, California
Mass media in Riverside County, California
BFR (FM)
Radio stations established in 2014
Defunct radio stations in the United States
Radio stations disestablished in 2016
2016 disestablishments in California
BFR (FM)